Grandview is a summer village in Alberta, Canada. It is located on the southwest shore of Pigeon Lake, in the County of Wetaskiwin No. 10.

Demographics 

In the 2016 Census of Population conducted by Statistics Canada, the Summer Village of Grandview had a population of 114 living in 57 of its 210 total private dwellings, a  change from its 2011 population of 108.

See also 
List of communities in Alberta
List of summer villages in Alberta
List of resort villages in Saskatchewan

References

External links 

1967 establishments in Alberta
Summer villages in Alberta